The Blonde Captive is a 1931 American controversial Pre-Code film directed by Clinton Childs, Ralph P. King, Linus J. Wilson, and Paul Withington. The film took previously released anthropological footage of native people in the Pacific and Australia, and added a sensationalised storyline.

After its 1947 re-screening the film went missing. A full print of the film was later discovered and made commercially available on DVD in 2010. It is also viewable online on YouTube.

Plot
The film is narrated by explorer Lowell Thomas. Dr. Paul Withington of Harvard University and archaeologist Clinton Childs conduct an anthropological expedition to Australia. The film opens with the men discussing the exhibition in "the explorers club". The exhibition hopes to travel and then find the people on earth most related to the ancient Neanderthals. Sailing from the west coast of North America, the expedition filmed indigenous peoples and customs of the islands along the way. The documentary stops in Hawaii and shows native Hawaiians. It then stops in Bali, where topless Balinese women are shown as they go about their daily life. Also visited are Indigenous Fijians in Fiji, and Māori living traditionally in New Zealand.

The documentary arrives in Sydney, and the harbour and city are shown. The documentary then travelling by train to Ooldea, South Australia where they filmed Aboriginals living in the desert. They then travel to Broome and visit the Aboriginal settlement of Boolah Boolah. They then sail to the Timor Sea and film indigenous people fishing. A dugong is cut up, and a sea turtle is dissected alive. The expedition returns to the mainland, where they again meet Aborigines "who have not lost their cannibal instincts." Examining the faces of Aborigines, with flashbacks to an anthropology book, the documentary declares that it has found the people on earth most resembling mankind's ancestor, the Neanderthals.

Hearing rumors of a white woman living with an Aboriginal tribe, the expedition eventually makes its way to a very remote area where they find a white women who is the sole survivor of a shipwreck. The woman is married to a tribal Aborigine and is mother to his blond-haired child. After inquiring about her welfare, she refuses to return to civilisation with them.

Cast
Lowell Thomas as himself (narrator)
Dr. Paul Withington as himself
Clinton Childs as himself

Production
Accompanied by Paul Withington, Clinton Childs and two cinematographers, in 1928 psychologist Stanley Porteus conducted psychological and psychophysical studies of Aboriginal groups in northwest Western Australia and Central Australia. The study was filmed and the resulting documentary was expected to show the results of an officially sanctioned scientific expedition exploring the Indigenous cultures in Northern Australia.

Produced by Porteus' North Western Australian Expedition Syndicate with a grant from the Australian National Research Council, the film was released as a 59-minute National Geographic style documentary by William Pizor's Imperial Pictures in 1931.

Anthropological footage re-edited by Columbia Pictures 
Following the documentary's debut in New York City, it was re-edited by Columbia Pictures. who added 15 minutes of footage, adding the subplot of a white American woman shipwrecked and marrying an Aboriginal. Renaming the resulting docudrama The Blonde Captive, Columbia released it in 1932. Imperial Pictures re-issued the movie in 1935 and Astor Pictures re-issued it again in 1947.

Contrary to the movie's title, the woman was neither captive nor blonde and she only appears in the movie's final five minutes.

Controversy
The movie was controversial in Australia for its racist and paternalistic approach to indigenous peoples. It compares the attractiveness of various Polynesian peoples with the "grotesque" cannibalistic Aboriginals who are obviously descended from Neanderthal ancestors, behave like monkeys and who practice "repulsively barbaric" customs. "...here is human life at its lowest form" says Lowell Thomas in his narration.

Promoted as an educational film and advertised as "An Absolutely Authentic Amazing Adventure", the media reviews treated the movie as a documentary. The scientific community denounced the additions to the film as fake, leading to significant academic controversy with accusations that the movie was promoted as an educational film to bypass censorship laws regarding nudity. Dr Withington made a public statement that footage of the white woman living with Aboriginals was authentic and the participation of Lowell Thomas, a famous explorer who had recently narrated Africa Speaks!, gave the movie credibility with the public.

Stanley Porteus had gained permission for his expedition on the premise that he was making a film about Aboriginal life for educational purposes. After the expedition returned to America, A. O. Neville, the Western Australian chief protector of Aborigines, became concerned about the film when Withington refused to reply to queries while Porteus gave confusing answers. When the film was released, its representation of Aboriginal life had been grossly distorted and manipulated. This had far-reaching consequences for future legitimate research in Western Australia. Only ever screened in North America, the movie was banned in Australia.

Film lost
After its 1947 screening the film went missing. In 2001, a reconstructed version of the film was restored from a partial nitrate Internegative. The reconstruction was screened at the XXXI Mostra Internazionale del Cinema Libero in Bologna in 2002.

A full print of the film was later discovered and made commercially available on DVD in 2010. The full film is also viewable on YouTube.

Soundtrack
The musical arrangement is by Carl Edouarde.

See also
Pre-Code Hollywood

Further reading 

Smith, A., 1990. White Missus of Arnhem Land, Northern Territory Press, Darwin, NT.
Tracey, M. M., 2007. Wooden Ships, Iron Men and Stalwart Ladies: The TSS Douglas Mawson Saga, (unpub,) the School of Archaeology and Anthropology, Australian National University, Canberra, ACT. http://www.heritagearchaeology.com.au/mt-phd.html
Tracey, M, M., 1997, 'The SS Douglas Mawson - A launching and a shipwreck', The Bulletin of the Australasian Institute for Maritime Archaeology, Volume 21, No 1 & 2, pp 9–18. http://www.heritagearchaeology.com.au/douglas-mawson.html 
Tracey, M. M. and Lambert Tracey, J., 1999. ‘The intrigue of the SS Douglas Mawson’, Australian Sea Heritage, Sydney Maritime Museum, Number 57, Sydney. http://www.heritagearchaeology.com.au/intrique-dm.html 
Tracey, M. A. 1994. 'When the Timber Cut Out’ - Archaeological Aspects of Timber Extraction Procedures and Shipbuilding in the Murramarang District, New South Wales', Honours Dissertation (unpub.), Department of Archaeology and Anthropology, Australian National University, Canberra, ACT. http://www.heritagearchaeology.com.au/mt-honours.html

External links

1931 films
1930s action adventure films
American black-and-white films
1930s rediscovered films
Australian action adventure films
American action adventure films
Australian black-and-white films
Rediscovered Australian films
Rediscovered American films
Anti-indigenous racism in Australia
1930s English-language films
1930s American films